Guillaume Domingue (29 November 1985 – 18 January 2022) was a Mauritian radio jockey and presenter. He was best known as the host of the show Morning Live on Mauritius Broadcasting Corporation's Kool FM from 6hr to 9hr.

Life and career
Domingue was the star host of Radio Plus (Mauritius), where he had started his radio career and also worked at the Mauritius Broadcasting Corporation and Wazaa FM (Mauritius). He died on 18 January 2022, at the age of 36.

References

External links 
 
 

1985 births
2022 deaths
Mauritian radio personalities